Bobbi Jene Smith (November 7, 1983) is an American dancer and actress.

She was the subject of Elvira Lind's documentary Bobbi Jene about her decision to leave the prestigious Israeli dance troupe Batsheva to try to choreograph her own pieces in America.

Early life and education
Smith was born in Centerville, Iowa. She attended the dance division at Juilliard but did not graduate, choosing instead to drop out at the age of 21.

Career

Dance
At the age of 21 Smith moved to Israel at the advice of Ohad Naharin where she joined the Batsheva Dance Company. She stayed in Israel dancing with Batsheva for 12 years.

Film
In 2012 Smith choreographed the dance piece Arrowed which she performed with actor Oscar Isaac. Isaac's girlfriend Elvira Lind was in the audience and she began a correspondence with Smith, eventually persuading Smith to let Lind film her for a documentary. The resulting film, Bobbi Jene premiered at the 2017 Tribeca Film Festival.

Smith made her feature film debut in the 2012 Israeli film Yossi in a small supporting role. She also appeared in Georgia Parris's 2018 dance-drama Mari, where she played the lead role of a woman mourning the loss of her mother.

In 2021, Smith co-starred with Or Schraiber in the accompanying film for the album Green to Gold by American indie rock band The Antlers, which involves the highs and lows of a relationship being portrayed entirely through interpretive dance.

References

External links
 

Living people
1983 births
American dancers